This movie could be found on YouTube in Canada when it first released in 2006.  It is nowhere to be found on YouTube now, in Canada.  Also information on Rob Mcgann is very limited.  

American Zeitgeist is a 2006 documentary film by Rob McGann. It discusses the war on terror and religion. It was the winner of the best feature-length documentary award at the Houston International Film Festival.

Cast
 Tariq Ali
 Paul Berman
 Richard Bulliet
 Noam Chomsky
 Steve Coll
 Hamid Dabashi
 David Frum
 Christopher Hitchens
 Samantha Power
 Craig Unger

References

External links

Review of American Zeitgeist in Opendemocracy.com
 

2006 films
American documentary films
Films about terrorism
2006 documentary films
2000s English-language films
2000s American films